Michelle Michiko Sagara (born May 5, 1963) is a Japanese-Canadian author of fantasy literature, active since the early 1990s. She has published as Michelle Sagara, as Michelle West (using her husband's surname) and as Michelle Sagara West. Sagara has received two nominations for the John W. Campbell Award.

She lives in Toronto and is employed part-time at Bakka-Phoenix, a local bookstore.

Biography 
Sagara is the eldest child of Japanese immigrants. As a child, Sagara loved reading Nancy Drew mysteries as well as the works of Enid Blyton and J. R. R. Tolkien. She studied Physics, then English, at the University of Toronto before dropping out to pursue writing. After she married in 1990, she began publishing under Michelle West. Her debut book, Into the Dark Lands was published in 1991. She has said, in a 2008 interview: "I submitted the first novel to Del Rey books in 1987. It was rejected, but with a phone call, and in the end I revised the manuscript and sent it back. The revision was passed on to Lester del Rey, who was alive at the time. He rejected it with a 4 page single space letter which had all the trademark curmudgeonliness for which he was famed. But buried in that 4 page letter was a very definite 'This flashback of 94 pages needs to be its own damn book, and it should be book one.' So... I wrote that novel, and I submitted that novel, and that's the novel they bought."

Bibliography

Novels

The Sundered
(as Michelle Sagara/Michelle Sagara West)

A Tolkienesque tale of love, betrayal, and redemption. Previously out of print, the series was reissued by BenBella Books under the name Michelle Sagara West.

Into the Dark Lands, 1991
Children of the Blood, 1992
Lady of Mercy, 1993
Chains of Darkness, Chains of Light, 1994

The Sacred Hunt
(as Michelle West, DAW Books)

The Kingdom of Breodanir is facing a threat unlike any seen for centuries. An orphan boy and his adopted brother struggle against the ties that bind them together (and to their land) as they complete an impossible journey to save the world - at the risk of their own destruction. These are the first books set in the Essalieyan universe to be published.

Hunter's Oath (October 1995)
Hunter's Death (June 1996)

The Sun Sword
(as Michelle West, DAW Books)

Sixteen years after the events of The Sacred Hunt, the Empire of Essalieyan and the Dominion of Annagar are at war due to machinations of the Kialli. The resulting struggle for power will define the lives of those who would bring an end to the Kialli threat. Events laid out in The Sacred Hunt are referenced, but are not necessary to follow the story.

The House Wars series intersects the Sun Sword series in the Essalieyan universe.  Michelle Sagara published a synopsis of the Sun Sword series for readers of House Wars to give necessary background.

The Broken Crown (July 1997)
The Uncrowned King (September 1998)
The Shining Court (August 1999)
Sea of Sorrows (May 2001)
The Riven Shield (July 2003)
The Sun Sword (January 2004)

The House War
(as Michelle West, DAW Books)

Set in the Essalieyan universe, The House War chronicles the story of Jewel and her rise in House Terafin. The first three novels return to the origin of Jewel and the discovery of her den. They also revisit some of the narrative from Hunter's Death, though told from different (and complementary) character perspectives.

The Hidden City: A Novel of the House War, Book 1 (March 2008)
City of Night: A Novel of the House War, Book 2 (February 2010)
House Name: A Novel of the House War, Book 3 (January 2011)

The concluding volumes, beginning with Skirmish, take place after events of The Sun Sword.

Skirmish: A Novel of the House War, Book 4 (January 2012)
Battle: A Novel of the House War, Book 5 (December 2012)
Oracle: A Novel of the House War, Book 6 (May 2015)  
Firstborn: A Novel of the House War, Book 7 (Feb 2019)  
War: A Novel of the House War, Book 8 (June 2019)

War is the final novel in the House Wars arc.

She intends to write a fourth series, wrapping up the events in the first three series (The Sacred Hunt, The Sun Sword and The House War). As of July 27th, 2021, these will not be published by DAW for business reasons. Work on them will be funded using Patreon, as mentioned in her blog.

Chronicles of Elantra
(as Michelle Sagara, Luna Books)

Kaylin is a young woman with a complicated history. Although taking place in a fantastical universe, this series has a strong tone of urban fantasy and a single character perspective. The books tend to be more procedural than the author's other novels, but with an underlying, driving plot.
 
Cast in Shadow (August 2005)
Cast in Courtlight (July 2006)
Cast in Secret (August 2007)
Cast in Fury (October 2008)
Cast in Silence (August 2009)
Cast in Chaos (August 2010)
Cast in Ruin (October 2011)
Cast in Peril (September 2012)
Cast in Sorrow (October 2013)
Cast in Flame (July 2014)
Cast in Honor (November 2015)
Cast in Flight (October 2016)  
Cast in Deception (January 2018)
Cast in Oblivion (January 2019)  
Cast in Wisdom (January 2020)
Cast in Conflict (June 2021)
Cast in Eternity (November 2022)
Shards of Glass (Forthcoming, Nov 28, 2023) 

Cast in Moonlight is a novella that describes Kaylin's introduction to the Hawks of Elantra. It was first published in Harvest Moon, a short story collection released by Luna Books in 2010, and later became available as a stand alone work.

The Chronicles of Elantra have also been made available as audio books.

The Wolves of Elantra
(as Michelle Sagara, Mira Books)

Multiple races carefully navigate the City of Elantra under the Dragon Emperor’s wing. His Imperial Wolves are executioners, the smallest group to serve in the Halls of Law. The populace calls them assassins.  This series is the backstory of the character Severn Handred introduced in Sagara's Chronicles of Elantra series.

The Emperor's Wolves (October 2020)
Sword and Shadow (February 2022)

Queen of the Dead
(as Michelle Sagara, DAW Books)

Emma Hall is a high school student whose first (and only) boyfriend died in the summer in a car accident  She spends far too much time in the cemetery at Nathan's grave and begins to see things she's never seen, and to hear things that no one else hears. Distinctly more "contemporary" urban fantasy than her other series.

Silence (May 2012)
Touch (January 2014)
Grave (February 2017)

Short stories
 "For Love of God" (1993) (in Mike Resnick's alternate history anthology Alternate Warriors)
 "What She Won't Remember" (1994) (in Mike Resnick's alternate history anthology Alternate Outlaws)
 "The Sword in the Stone" (1997) (in Mike Resnick's alternate history anthology Alternate Tyrants)
 "Dust" (2000) (in How I Survived My Summer Vacation, a Buffy the Vampire Slayer anthology)
 Speaking with Angels (as Michelle West) - a collection of short stories (2003)

Other short stories by Michelle Sagara West have appeared in magazines and anthologies under a variety of surnames.

The author has decided to release many, if not all, of her short stories as e-books, as her schedule permits. Additionally, the six stories specifically related to the Essalieyan novels are available together in a single-volume, on-demand print format titled Memory of Stone and other stories.

"Sigurne" is a short story created from material that was edited out of ORACLE. Michelle Sagara has made the short story available for free download in PDF format on her website.

Review columns and blog
Under the name Michelle West, Sagara writes a long running book review column, Musing on Books, for The Magazine of Fantasy & Science Fiction. As of the end of 2019, she has written 56 columns.
On her own personal website, she writes a blog where she regularly gives updates on her writing and other events.

References

External links 
Official Home Page
Michelle West Yahoo Discussion Group
 
 "75+ Urban Fantasy Writers Who Aren’t White", July 18, 2020.

1963 births
Living people
Canadian women novelists
Canadian fantasy writers
Canadian people of Japanese descent
Canadian writers of Asian descent
Women science fiction and fantasy writers
The Magazine of Fantasy & Science Fiction people